Dimitrios "Mimis" Stefanidis (born 28 October 1931) is a former international professional basketball player and basketball coach, from Greece. He was born in Athens.

Professional career
Stefanidis was a member of the Panellinios Basketball Club and its famous 1950s era "Chrysi Pentada", or "The Golden Five" in English. With Panellinios, he won 3 Greek League championships, in the years 1953, 1955, and 1957. He also won two European Club Championships with the club, as he won the 1955 Brussels Basketball Tournament and the 1956 San Remo Basketball Tournament. While he was also a runner-up at the 1954 San Remo Tournament.

National team career
Stefanidis was a member of the senior men's Greek national basketball team. With Greece, he competed at the following tournaments: the 1951 Mediterranean Games, the 1951 EuroBasket, the 1952 Summer Olympic Games, and the 1955 Mediterranean Games, where he won a bronze medal.

Coaching career
After his basketball playing career ended, Stefanidis became a basketball coach. He worked as a coach in teams such as Panellinios, Pagrati, Sporting, Panathinaikos, and Olympiacos.

Personal
His daughter is Tatiana Stefanidou.

References

External links
   (English translation via Google)
   (English translation via Google)

1931 births
Living people
Basketball players at the 1952 Summer Olympics
Greek basketball coaches
Greek Basket League players
Greek men's basketball players
Olimpia Milano players
Olympic basketball players of Greece
Pagrati B.C. coaches
Panellinios B.C. players
Power forwards (basketball)
Reyer Venezia players
Small forwards
Basketball players from Athens
Basketball players at the 1955 Mediterranean Games
Mediterranean Games bronze medalists for Greece
Mediterranean Games medalists in basketball